Darwin Gregorio Lom Moscoso (born 14 July 1997) is a Guatemalan professional footballer who plays as a forward for Liga Nacional club Xelajú and the Guatemala national team.

Career

Chattanooga FC
On 10 July 2020, Lom signed a professional contract with American soccer team Chattanooga FC. He had previously played for the team in 2017 while it competed in the National Premier Soccer League.

California United Strikers FC
On 24 March 2021, following the Fall 2020 season, Lom signed with California United Strikers FC for the Spring NISA season.

Hartford Athletic 
On 17 August 2021, he joined USL Championship team Hartford Athletic. He made his debut that day in a 2-1 win vs. Charleston Battery.

Career statistics

Club

International

International goals
Score and result list Guatemala's goal tally first.

References

External links
 Darwin Lom at Shorter University
 Darwin Lom at Nova Southeastern University

1997 births
Living people
Guatemalan footballers
Guatemalan expatriate footballers
Guatemala international footballers
Association football midfielders
Liga Nacional de Fútbol de Guatemala players
National Independent Soccer Association players
C.D. Guastatoya players
California United Strikers FC players
Chattanooga FC players
Guatemalan expatriate sportspeople in the United States
Expatriate soccer players in the United States
Shorter Hawks men's soccer players
Nova Southeastern Sharks men's soccer players
People from El Progreso Department
2021 CONCACAF Gold Cup players
Hartford Athletic players
USL Championship players